Anna Christina Gestrin (born 12 January 1967 in Helsinki) is a Finnish politician, former park ranger, Member of Parliament from 2000 to 2015 and former vice chairman of the Swedish People's Party of Finland (1998-2005).

Gestrin lives on an estate in Espoo. She is married and has three daughters.

References

1967 births
Living people
Politicians from Helsinki
Swedish People's Party of Finland politicians
Members of the Parliament of Finland (1999–2003)
Members of the Parliament of Finland (2003–07)
Members of the Parliament of Finland (2007–11)
Members of the Parliament of Finland (2011–15)
Women members of the Parliament of Finland
21st-century Finnish women politicians